Lizard is a locality consisting of a group of islands in the Coral Sea within the Shire of Cook, Queensland, Australia.

History 
The locality takes its name from Lizard Island, the largest island in the locality. The island was named on 12 August 1770 by Lieutenant James Cook, commander of HMS Endeavour, with the comment "...the only land animals we saw here were lizards".

References 

Shire of Cook
Localities in Queensland